Ganapathi Bose (8 January 1939 – 7 July 2011) was an Indian cricketer. He played one first-class match for Bengal in 1965/66.

See also
 List of Bengal cricketers

References

External links
 

1939 births
2011 deaths
Indian cricketers
Bengal cricketers
Cricketers from Kolkata